Redemptionis sacramentum ("Sacrament of Redemption") is an instruction on the proper way to celebrate Mass in the Roman Rite and others, and considered as well the adoration of the Blessed Sacrament. It was issued by the Congregation for Divine Worship and the Discipline of the Sacraments on 25 March 2004 over the signature of the Congregation's prefect, Cardinal Francis Arinze. It was designed to aid bishops in implementing the Roman Missal, issued in 2002. It follows Pope John Paul II's 2003 encyclical, Ecclesia de Eucharistia calling for an Instruction on the liturgical norms.

As its reason for issuing the document, the congregation stated:

The instruction discusses, among other things, the roles of the clergy and laity, distribution of communion, and Eucharistic adoration outside of Mass. It is based on the 1963 Sacrosanctum Concilium (the Constitution on the Sacred Liturgy).

The congregation declared:

It addressed a variety of specific issues unrelated to abuses or departure from established norms. For example, it made clear that "Girls or women may also be admitted to this service of the altar, at the discretion of the diocesan Bishop and in observance of the established norms".

See also

Mirae caritatis
Roman Missal
Sacraments of the Catholic Church

References
 

Catholic liturgy
Documents of the Congregation for Divine Worship and the Discipline of the Sacraments
Eucharist

External links 

 Redemptionis sacramentum